World Games is a sports video game developed by Epyx for the Commodore 64 in 1986. Versions for the Apple IIGS, Amstrad CPC, ZX Spectrum, Sega Master System and other contemporary systems were also released. The NES version was released by Milton Bradley, and ported by Software Creations on behalf of producer Rare. A Virtual Console version was released in Europe on April 25, 2008.

The game was a continuation in the Epyx sports line that previously released extremely successful titles such as Summer Games and Winter Games.

Events
The events available vary slightly depending on the platform, and may include:

Weightlifting (Soviet Union)
Slalom skiing (France)
Log rolling (Canada)
Cliff diving (Mexico)
Caber toss (Scotland)
Bull riding (United States)
Barrel jumping (Germany)
Sumo Wrestling (Japan)

The game allowed the player to compete in all of the events sequentially, choose a few events, choose just one event, or practice an event.

Reception

Writing for Info, Benn Dunnington gave the Commodore 64 version of World Games three-plus stars out of five and described it as "my least favorite of the series". Stating that slalom skiing was the best event, he concluded that "Epyx does such a nice, consistent job of execution, tho, that it's hard to take off too many points even for such boring material". Computer Gaming Worlds Rick Teverbaugh criticized the slalom skiing and log rolling events' difficulty, but concluded that "World Games is still a must for the avid sports games". Charles Ardai called the game "an adequate sequel" to Epyx's previous Games, and praised the graphics. He criticized the mechanics "as bizarre little joystick patterns which have little to do with the events" but still recommended the game because of the log rolling event. Jame Trunzo praised the game's use of advanced graphics and sound, including humorous effects. Also noted was the variety in the included games, preventing the game from getting too repetitive.

The game was reviewed in 1988 in Dragon #132 by Hartley, Patricia, and Kirk Lesser in "The Role of Computers" column. The reviewers gave the game 5 out of 5 stars.

A budget-priced re-release of the Commodore 64 version was positively received in Commodore User who said it was "the pinnacle of the Games series".

References

External links

1986 video games
Amiga games
Apple IIGS games
Amstrad CPC games
Atari ST games
Commodore 64 games
Epyx games
Master System games
MSX games
Multiple-sport video games
Nintendo Entertainment System games
U.S. Gold games
Video games developed in the United States
Video games scored by David Wise
Video games set in Canada
Video games set in France
Video games set in Germany
Video games set in Japan
Video games set in Mexico
Video games set in Russia
Video games set in Scotland
Video games set in the United States
Virtual Console games
ZX Spectrum games
Single-player video games
Milton Bradley Company video games